The  is an archaeological site consisting of the ruins of middle Jōmon period settlement, located in what is now part of the city of Hokuto, Yamanashi in the Chūbu region of Japan. The site was designated a National Historic Site of Japan in 2014.

Overview
In this region, the density of middle Jōmon period ruins is very great, at about three to five kilometer intervals on river terraces of the Yuzawa River, connected by traces of a road, and with remnants related to cultivated areas in side valleys. The Umenoki ruins consist of the traces of a village with up to 150 dwellings surrounding an elliptical central plaza with dimensions of 60 meters north-to-south by 20 meters east-to-west. The village consisted of pit dwellings from the middle to the end of the Jōmon period (About 5000 to 4500 years ago). These structures are assumed to have had conical roofs, and were five to seven meters in diameter. Many artifacts of Jōmon pottery and stone tools were also excavated from the site.

The site is now preserved as the Umenoki Archaeological Park by the city of Hokuto with a small museum and where volunteers have recreated some faux pit house reconstructions. The site if located about 20 minutes by car from Anayama Station or 30 minutes by car from Nagasaka Station on the JR East Chūō Main Line.

See also
List of Historic Sites of Japan (Yamanashi)

References

External links
Yamanashi Prefectural official site 
Hokuto city official site 

Jōmon period
History of Yamanashi Prefecture
Hokuto, Yamanashi
Historic Sites of Japan
Archaeological sites in Japan